Timotheus Bernardus Maria De Leede (born 25 January 1968), or commonly as Tim de Leede, is a former Dutch cricketer who had a long One Day International (ODI) career of 11 years for the Dutch national side. A right-handed all-rounder, he played for the Netherlands at the 1996, 2003, and 2007 World Cups. His son, Bas de Leede, also played cricket for the Netherlands.

Coaching career
In January 2015, de Leede was appointed as the head coach of the France national cricket team. He coached the side at the 2015 European Twenty20 Championship.

References

Sources

1968 births
Living people
Netherlands One Day International cricketers
People from Leidschendam
Dutch cricket coaches
Dutch cricket captains
Dutch cricketers
Sportspeople from South Holland